The Toyota Prius c (c stands for "city"), named the  ("aqua" is Latin for water) in Japan, is a full hybrid gasoline-electric subcompact/supermini hatchback manufactured and marketed by Toyota. The Prius c is the third member of the Prius family, and combines the features of a Yaris-sized car with a hybrid powertrain. The Prius c is priced lower than the conventional Prius and has a higher fuel economy in city driving under United States Environmental Protection Agency test cycles. The Prius c was ranked by the EPA as the 2012 most fuel efficient compact car when plug-in electric vehicles are excluded.

The production version of the Aqua was unveiled in the 2011 Tokyo Motor Show. The production Prius c was introduced in the U.S. at the January 2012 North American International Auto Show in Detroit. The Aqua was launched in Japan in December 2011 at a price of  million.  Sales in several Asian markets began in January 2012. The Prius c was released in the U.S. and Canada in March 2012. Sales in Australia and New Zealand began in April 2012.

The Aqua is considered the most successful nameplate launch in Japan in the last 20 years. , the Aqua/Prius c is the second most sold hybrid of Toyota after the regular Prius, with 1,380,100 units sold worldwide. Japan as the market leader with 1,154,500 units sold through January 2017. The Aqua was the top selling new car in Japan for three years in a row, from 2013 to 2015.

The Prius C was discontinued in North America at the end of the 2019 model year. It was also discontinued in Australia in early 2020.

Prius c Concept

The Toyota Prius c concept car was unveiled at the January 2011 North American International Auto Show in Detroit. The design takes cues from the Toyota FT-CH concept vehicle that was shown at the same event in 2010. Toyota explained that the 'c' in 'Prius c' stands for "city"-centric vehicle as it is much smaller than the normal Prius and is aimed at younger buyers without families who require little space.

Together with the introduction of the production version of the Toyota Aqua at the 2011 Tokyo Motor Show, the carmaker also exhibited two other Aqua concepts, the Aqua Kiriri version and the Aqua Piriri.

Specifications

Built on an enhanced and streamlined Yaris-inspired platform, the Prius c features Toyota's Generation 3 Hybrid Synergy Drive with a 1.5-liter DOHC four-cylinder, 16–valve with VVT-i gasoline engine, the same engine model and displacement as on the earliest Priuses, but is now "beltless".  The air conditioner is a self-contained unit containing a motor & compressor powered by the 144-volt traction battery, and the 12-volt battery is charged via a DC-DC converter also powered by the traction battery.

Unlike earlier Prius HSDs, the Prius c incorporates separate planetary gear reduction paths for the ICE/MG (internal combustion engine/motor-generator) one, now better matched to their respective mission functions, in a significantly smaller, lighter weight package. The chain drive found in the Gen 1 and Gen 2 HSDs is also eliminated, replaced by helical gears in the Gen 3 HSD.  The MG2 ratio is 2.5:1 rather than 1:1 as on earlier HSDs, thereby allowing the physical size of the MG2 to be reduced to the cross-section of the MG1. The Prius v and Prius Plug-in share this basic Gen 3 design (P410 transaxle, for both of these), but not its specific implementation, and which is unique to the Prius c and its lower maximum weight, and lower HSD net horsepower (P510 transaxle, for Prius c, North America; Prius Aqua, Japan; and Yaris Hybrid, Europe).

The hybrid system includes a new high-voltage battery and inverter, and a smaller auxiliary 12 volt battery. Both batteries are housed underneath the rear passenger bench seat, and are easily accessible to service personnel, yet are protected from possible collision damage by a welded tubular steel cage which also acts as support for the rear seat. Being housed underneath the passenger seat, the large high voltage traction battery does not impact the trunk space, unlike the traction battery on earlier Priuses. This location for the traction battery also significantly lowers the center of gravity of the Prius c, and improves road handling.

The hybrid powertrain weighs around  less than that of the standard Prius Liftback.

This places the Prius c in the American subcompact class. Japanese versions are also compliant with Japanese government dimension regulations which reduce tax liability (the regular Prius had exceeded it since the second generation). The use of a 1.5 litre engine also reduces the annual Japanese Government road tax obligation.

Two optional driving modes are offered: "EV Mode enables electric driving for up to one mile. ECO Mode limits the operation of the climate control and adjusts throttle input to help maximize fuel economy".

Fuel economy and emissions

The Prius c emission certification is SULEV.

The Prius c was ranked by the EPA as the 2012 model year most fuel efficient compact car excluding plug-in electric vehicles. When electric-powered cars are considered, the Chevrolet Volt ranks on top of the compact car category, followed by the Prius c.

Production
The Prius c is assembled at the Iwate Plant of Toyota Motor East Japan, Inc., a wholly owned subsidiary of Toyota Motor Corporation, in Kanegasaki, Iwate in northern Japan. Toyota's initial production capacity for the Aqua/Prius c at this facility was 12,000 units per month, with a maximum production capacity of 30,000 units per month.

Facelift updates
The first facelift of the Prius c was presented at the November 2014 Los Angeles Auto Show. The new model has a revised front bumper and headlights similar to the GT86, with a more aggressive and aerodynamic look. The tail lights are also modified, now incorporating black plastic segments towards the leading edge. The interior features metallic open/close AC vents, as well as a redesigned climate control cluster and a updated, digital speedometer interface design.

A second facelift of the Toyota Prius c was released in 2017 with minor subtle changes. Changes included; reshaping of bonnet, re-sculpted bumpers, redesigned LED c-shaped tail lamps, new wheel arches.

Persona Series 
For the American market, the 2016 model year Persona Series was based on the 2016 model year Prius C. The Persona Series comes with a black-on-black color scheme for the exterior paint and alloy wheels. Bright color accents, available in either Electric Lime or Cherry Pearl, adorn the lower front grille, the headlight surrounds, the side mirrors, and the window trim to give a baseball theme. The Persona Series comes standard with keyless entry, automatic climate control, cloth seats, and Bluetooth. Toyota will only sell 1,500 of these special-edition models.

GR Sport 
In September 2017, Toyota released the Aqua GR Sport for the Japanese market. It weighed 1,100 kg (1,110 kg for vehicles with 17-inch tires), was 4,070 mm long, 1,695mm wide, and 1,455 high (1,440 mm for vehicles with 17-inch tires). It also had specially tuned suspension, additional spot welding points, brace addition (vehicles with 17-inch tires only), tachometer (vehicles with 17-inch tires only), aluminum pedals (vehicles with 17-inch tires only), and a leather-wrapped shift knob. Despite external appearances being similar to the GR Yaris, the interior appearance/layout is that of a 2020 Prius C.

Markets and sales
During 2012 a total of 315,406 units were sold worldwide, led by Japan with 266,574 Aquas sold, representing 84.5% of the model global sales. The Prius c is not available in Europe, instead, Toyota is selling the Toyota Yaris Hybrid since June 2012. The Yaris Hybrid shares the same powertrain as the Prius c. Global sales of the Aqua/Prius c passed the 500,000 milestone in August 2013, and the 1 million milestone during the first half of 2015.

, the Aqua/Prius c is the second most sold hybrid of Toyota Motor Corporation after the regular Prius, with 1,380,100 units sold worldwide. The market leader is Japan with 1,154,500 units sold, capturing 83.6% of global sales. Ranking second is the U.S. with 177,218 units sold through December 2016, and Canada with 11,879 through April 2016. A total of 31,000 units have been sold in the rest of the world through April 2016. For three years running, 2013 through 2015, the Aqua was the top selling new car in Japan. The Aqua is considered the most successful nameplate launch in Japan in the last 20 years.

The following table presents retail sales since deliveries of the Aqua began in December 2011 for the top selling national markets by year through April 2016.

Japan

The Aqua was launched in Japan in December 2011 at a price of  million, and is available at all Japanese Toyota networks Toyota Store, Toyopet Store, Corolla Store and Toyota Netz. Toyota initially established a sales target of 12,000 units per month, but before its market launch, Toyota had received orders for 60,000 Aquas, creating a four-month waiting list for deliveries. By 31 January 2012, the number of orders grew to 120,000. The Aqua was the third top selling new car in the Japanese market in February and March 2012, and ranked second from April through September, surpassed only by the combined sales of the regular Prius and Prius α, as Toyota is reporting sales of both models together. The Aqua ranked as the top selling new car in Japan in October 2012, surpassing combined sales of the regular Prius and the Prius α, which ranked second, and ending the Prius brand record of being the top selling new car in Japan for 16 months in a row. The Aqua kept the top selling spot through December 2012, and with 266,567 units sold in 2012, the Aqua ranked as the second best selling car that year after the Prius brand. When sales of these two Prius models are broken down, the Toyota Aqua ranks as the top selling model in Japan, including kei cars, and the Aqua led monthly sales since February through December 2012.

The Aqua continued as the top selling car in Japan during every month of the first quarter of 2013, and after ranking second behind the Toyota Prius during the second quarter, the Aqua was again the top selling car in Japan during the third quarter of 2013. A total of 262,367 Aquas were sold in 2013, down 1.6% from 2012, but nevertheless, the Aqua topped new car sales in Japan in 2013, including kei car sales. With 233,212 units sold during 2014, down 11.1% from 2013, the Aqua was the top selling new car in Japan for the second consecutive year. Again in 2015, with 215,525 units sold, down 7.6% from 2014, the Aqua ranked as the top selling new car in Japan. During the first quarter of 2016, the Prius liftback surpassed the Aqua as the best selling new car, and ended 2016 as the second best-selling new car with 168,208 units sold.

Since its introduction, a total of 1,154,500 units have been sold in Japan through January 2017, representing 83.6% of the model global sales. In addition of being the best-selling new car in Japan for three consecutive years, 2013 through 2015, the Toyota Aqua is considered the most successful nameplate launch in the Japanese market of the last 20 years.

United States
Sales of the Prius c began in the U.S. in March 2012, at a price starting at  plus a  destination charge. After three days in the American market, the carmaker announced that the Prius c became "one of Toyota's fastest-selling vehicles." During its first month in the market, the Prius c sold 4,875 units, accounting for 17.0% of the Prius family sales in the U.S. A total of 35,733 units were sold during 2012, and the Prius c ranked as the fourth best selling hybrid car in the U.S that year. During 2013 a total of 41,979 units were sold, allowing the Prius c to rank as the third top selling hybrid car during that year, behind the  Prius liftback and the Camry Hybrid sedan. During the first nine months of 2014 Prius c sales were down by 4.7% as compared with the same period in 2013, following the same declining trend as the overall hybrid segment in the American market. , a total of 177,218 units have been sold since its introduction in March 2012.

The Prius c is offered in four trims named Prius c One through Prius c Four. The basic level Prius c One includes power windows and door locks, automatic climate control, Multi-Information Display (MID), Hill Start Assist Control (HAC), Remote Keyless Entry, projector-beam halogen headlamps, steering wheel-mounted audio controls, 4-speaker audio, Bluetooth hands-free telephone controls, Bluetooth and USB auxiliary outlets, and rear intermittent window wiper. The Prius c Four, which sells for  also includes Softex-trimmed seats, heated front power mirrors with turn signal indicators, alloy wheels, and fog lamps.

For the 2015 model year, the Prius c received a light facelift with alterations to the front and rear lamps and bumpers. Three new bright colors have also been added to the North American lineup.

Canada
During its first month in the Canadian market, 328 units were sold and the Prius c represented about 25% of Toyota subcompact sales that month. A total of 556 units were sold in April, its first full month in the market, accounting for 39% of total Prius family sales and 33% of Toyota subcompact sales. A total of 2,530 units were sold during 2012, 2,816 units in 2013, and sales declined to 2,776 in 2014, and recovered to 3,029 in 2015. Since its introduction, a total of 11,876 Prius c hybrids have been sold through April 2016.

Australia
A total of 1,883 units were sold during 2012, significantly ahead of Prius v (936 units)  and the conventional Prius (861 units). Sales during the first half of 2013 reached 1,242 units, again surpassing Prius v (539 units) and the Prius liftback (277 units). Again in 2014, sales of the Prius c (1,654) topped its siblings Prius v (722) and the third-generation Prius hatch (487). , cumulative sales since introduction totaled 7,432 units.

Other countries

Excluding the Japanese and North American markets, a total of 25,462 units have been sold in other countries .
Costa Rica
As the other electric-drive vehicles sold in the country, the Prius c is subject to lower import duties and local taxes. Since October 2012, Prius c owners are exempted from the driving restriction by license plate number used to control access to downtown San José, the country's capital.

Ecuador

Hong Kong
A total of 358 Prius c were sold during 2012, surpassing combined sales of the conventional Prius (132 units) and the Prius v (113).

Korea (Republic of)
Toyota launched the Prius c in South Korea in March 2018, with the standard price of 

Malaysia
The Prius c was launched in Malaysia in February 2012, where it costs  including insurance.

New Zealand

Philippines

Singapore

Taiwan

Uruguay
At this time, the price was too high compared to other vehicles in the market. In consequence of this, it sold less than 10 cars.

Recognition
 The Prius c was one of the five finalists for the 2013 Green Car of the Year awarded by the Green Car Journal at the 2012 Los Angeles Auto Show.
 In November 2012, Consumer Reports ranked the Prius c as the most reliable 2012 model year vehicle in the United States. The magazine based this later ranking on reliability data obtained through its annual auto survey that covers 1.2 million vehicles owned or leased by subscribers to Consumer Reports.  In 2018, they recognized Toyota as the second most reliable automobile manufacturer, and the Prius C as the most reliable vehicle offered by the company. The magazine had previously given a negative review for the Prius c. The magazine had based this earlier ranking on driving tests by its own testers.

Replacement 
The Prius C was discontinued in the United States and Canada after the 2019 model year, with the larger E210-series Corolla Hybrid indirectly taking its place. In Australia and New Zealand, it was replaced by the XP210-series Yaris Hybrid since early 2020. In Japan, the Aqua nameplate continues with introduction of the second-generation Aqua in July 2021. The Aqua continued to be sold alongside the related Yaris (formerly Vitz). In Taiwan, the Prius C (both the standard and the crossover variant) was discontinued in March 2021, citing internal competition with the Toyota Corolla Cross.

See also

Toyota Prius
Toyota Prius v
Toyota Prius Plug-in Hybrid

References

External links

Toyota Prius C global site
Toyota Aqua(Japan)
Videos
Prius c production model
Prius c concept at 2011 NAIAS

Toyota Prius
Prius, Toyota
Cars introduced in 2011
2020s cars
Subcompact cars
Hatchbacks
Front-wheel-drive vehicles
Hybrid electric cars
Partial zero-emissions vehicles
Vehicles with CVT transmission